The Southern General Hospital (SGH) was a large teaching hospital with an acute operational bed complement of approximately 900 beds. The hospital was located in Linthouse in the south west of Glasgow, Scotland. All facilities and services have been succeeded by the Queen Elizabeth University Hospital which was constructed on the site of the old hospital.

History
The hospital had its origins in the Govan Combination Poorhouse located in old cavalry barracks at Eglinton Street in 1852. A new 240-bed hospital and 180-patient lunatic asylum were designed by James Thomson and completed in 1872. A major extension involving 700 more beds was completed in 1905. The hospital was formally renamed the Southern General Hospital in 1923 and it joined the National Health Service in 1948.

Upgrading of the hospital's facilities began during the 1950s and culminated in the opening of a new maternity unit in 1970 and the completion of the Institute of Neurological Sciences in 1972, where the Glasgow Coma Scale was devised by Graham Teasdale and Bryan Jennett in 1974.

The Langlands Building, which provides care for the elderly, was procured under a Private Finance Initiative contract in 1999, was built by Carillion and opened in 2001. The laboratory, established to process results from hospitals all around Scotland, cost £90 million and opened in 2012.

All services were transferred to the Queen Elizabeth University Hospital in 2015.

References

External links

Hospital buildings completed in 1872
Hospitals in Glasgow
Teaching hospitals in Scotland
Defunct hospitals in Scotland
Govan
NHS Scotland hospitals
1872 establishments in Scotland
Former psychiatric hospitals in Scotland
Hospitals disestablished in 2015
2015 disestablishments in Scotland